Winter Nights is an album by jazz guitarist Al Di Meola.

Track listing
 "Zima" (Al di Meola) – 4:05 			
 "Carol of the Bells" – 4:11 			
 "Winterlude Duet No. 1" (Roman Hrynkiv, Al di Meola) – 1:27 			
 "Greensleeves" (Traditional) – 2:46 			
 "Mercy Street" (Peter Gabriel) – 4:52 			
 "Have Yourself a Merry Little Christmas" (Ralph Blane, Hugh Martin) – 4:32 			
 "Winterlude No. 2" (Roman Hrynkiv) – 0:51 			
 "Midwinter Nights" (Al di Meola) – 4:50 			
 "Scarborough Fair" (Traditional) – 4:36 			
 "Winterlude No. 3" (Roman Hrynkiv) – 0:47 			
 "The First Noel" (William Sandys) – 3:13 			
 "Inverno" (Al di Meola) – 5:38 			
 "First Snow" (Al di Meola) – 2:43 			
 "Winterlude No. 4" (Al di Meola) – 1:31 			
 "Ave Maria" (Bach/Gounod) – 4:51

Personnel
Musicians
 Al Di Meola – cajon, dumbek, acoustic guitar, harp, keyboards, mixing, percussion, tambur
 Roman Hrynkiv – bandura
 Hernan Romero – acoustic guitar, mixing, percussion, shaker

Other credits
 Anilda Carrasquillo – art direction, design
 Thoms Macko – design
 Spyros Poulos – digital editing, engineer, mixing
 Rich Tozzoli – engineer, mixing
 Robert Woods – executive producer

Chart performance

References

1999 Christmas albums
Al Di Meola albums
Christmas albums by American artists
Jazz Christmas albums
Telarc Records albums